Burning Well is a village in Sergeant Township, McKean County, Pennsylvania, United States. Like Paradise, Pennsylvania, it attracts people because of its name. It is named after a local oil field.

References

Unincorporated communities in McKean County, Pennsylvania
Unincorporated communities in Pennsylvania